Ditylenchus africanus (Peanut pod nematode) is a plant pathogenic nematode.

References 

Tylenchida
Agricultural pest nematodes
Nematodes described in 1995